Frances Mary White, née Cottam, MBE (21 May 1925 – 30 March 2017) was an English physician and chairwoman of the Bromsgrove Festival.

References

1925 births
2017 deaths
20th-century English medical doctors
Members of the Order of the British Empire